The Fleshtones are an American garage rock band from Queens, New York, United States, formed in 1976.

History

1976–1979 
The Fleshtones were formed in 1976 in Whitestone, New York, by Keith Streng (born September 18, 1955, New York City) and Jan Marek Pakulski (born August 23, 1956, Lewiston, Maine), two roommates who discovered that a previous tenant had left behind some instruments in the basement of the house they were renting. Streng, on guitar, and Pakulski, on bass, were soon joined by neighborhood friends Peter Zaremba (born September 16, 1954, Queens, New York), on harmonica, keyboards, and vocals, and Lenny Calderon (born 1956, New York City), on drums. Starting in 1978, the group was often joined onstage by Action Combo, brothers Gordon (alto sax and harmonica) and Brian (tenor sax) Spaeth. Gordon Spaeth (September 21, 1951 – March 8, 2005) became an official band member in 1983.

The Fleshtones debuted at CBGB on May 19, 1976. In the late 1970s, The Fleshtones earned a local following and played often in Manhattan at CBGB and Max's Kansas City. Later, they found a favorite venue at Club 57 on St. Mark's Place. The Fleshtones were the first band to be booked or to play at several famous venues, including Irving Plaza and Danceteria in Manhattan, Maxwell's in Hoboken, New Jersey, and the original 9:30 Club in Washington, D.C.

The Fleshtones shared a rehearsal space with The Cramps on the Bowery in Manhattan in 1977. The following year, The Fleshtones signed with Marty Thau's Red Star Records, and recorded their first album. In addition, filmmaker/artist M. Henry Jones and the band produced Soul City, a performance-animation video composed of hand-painted cutouts that is a historic representation of the band and Jones' art form. The Fleshtones' first single, titled "American Beat", was issued on Red Star in 1979.

1980–1989 

In 1980, with the Red Star Records album not released (but later issued on cassette on ROIR, and subsequently on CD and vinyl), the Fleshtones were signed by Miles Copeland III at I.R.S. Records, where they worked with producers Richard Mazda and Richard Gottehrer. It was at this time that the band replaced Calderon with drummer Bill Milhizer (born September 21, 1948, Troy, New York), and appeared in the British punk/new wave film Urgh! A Music War, and released its first EP Up-Front. Four albums on I.R.S. followed: Roman Gods (1982), Hexbreaker!! (1983), and the live Speed Connection and Speed Connection II (1985). In 1982, they appeared on Dick Clark's American Bandstand TV show. In 1984 they re-recorded "American Beat" as part of the soundtrack of the Tom Hanks's movie Bachelor Party.

Despite having a large cult following, the band never achieved commercial success: Roman Gods debuted at No. 174 on Billboard’s album chart, the highest position that a Fleshtones release would attain until 2020, when Face of the Screaming Werewolf debuted at No. 9 on Billboard’s Alternative New Artist Albums Chart, and 2021, when the "Mi Engañaste Bien" single entered the Billboard Hot Singles Chart at No. 38.

Zaremba was the host of I.R.S. Records Presents The Cutting Edge on MTV from 1984 to 1987. The I.R.S. Records-produced show featured up and coming underground artists. The program was short-lived but the format prefigured 120 Minutes. Zaremba's MC talents surfaced again in the late 1990s at New York City's "Cavestomp" Garage Rock festivals.

In the mid-1980s, The Fleshtones regularly played at the Pyramid Club on Avenue A in the East Village, and were instrumental in helping to start Wigstock, the drag queen festival that became a New York City staple. In the late 1980s, The Fleshtones were without major-label support, though they continued to tour America and Europe steadily, including shows opening for Chuck Berry and James Brown. In 1987, The Fleshtones made an appearance on the final episode of Andy Warhol's Andy Warhol's Fifteen Minutes, an MTV program, during which they backed up famed English stage actor Ian McKellen as he recited William Shakespeare's Twentieth Sonnet.

The Fleshtones recorded the title track to the 1987 camp-horror film I Was a Teenage Zombie. They released the albums Fleshtones vs. Reality (studio) in 1987 and Soul Madrid (live) in 1989. I.R.S. Records released a best-of compilation, Living Legends, in 1989.

In late 1986, Pakulski left the Fleshtones. He was replaced by Robert Burke Warren, who left the band in 1988. Fred Smith of Television and Andy Shernoff of The Dictators were interim bass players in the studio and on tour until 1990.

1990–2000
Ken Fox (born February 16, 1961, Toronto, Ontario) joined the Fleshtones on bass in July 1990. Fox had formed Raving Mojos in Toronto and played with Joan Osborne and in Jason & the Scorchers. Since Fox joined, the Fleshtones lineup has remained stable.

In 1992, the Fleshtones signed with Ichiban Records, where they stayed until the label's demise. In the 1990s, the Fleshtones worked with musician-producers Dave Faulkner, Peter Buck, and Steve Albini.

2001–present
In the 21st century, the Fleshtones collaborated with musician-producers Rick Miller, Jim Diamond, Lenny Kaye, and Ivan Julian, as well as self-producing work in Paul Johnson's Compactor basement studio in Brooklyn. The Fleshtones signed with Yep Roc Records in 2003.

The Fleshtones were one of the last bands to play at Windows on the World atop the World Trade Center. In 2002, they played at a Night of Remembrance and Hope festival at CBGB.

In December of 2003, the Fleshtones played at a CBGB 30th Anniversary show along with The Dictators, and in August of the next year, played Little Steven's Underground Garage Festival at Randalls Island in New York City with 39 other bands, including The New York Dolls, Iggy Pop, The Strokes, and Bo Diddley.

In September 2016, the Fleshtones toured China for the first time in the band's career. The tour was organized by Shanghai-based punk band Round Eye.

Book, tribute, feature documentary and reissues
In 2007, Continuum Books (now Bloomsbury) published Sweat: The Story of The Fleshtones, America's Garage Band, an authorized biography by Joe Bonomo. Camion Blanc released a French-language edition, The Fleshtones: Histoire d’un Groupe Garage Américain, in 2012.
Vindicated! A Tribute to The Fleshtones was released in 2007 on vinyl by Larsen Records (France) and on CD by Dirty Water Records (UK). The album features 23 international bands (including Hoodoo Gurus, the Nomads with Handsome Dick Manitoba, the Slickee Boys, the Woggles, Snax, the Swingin' Neckbreakers, Richard Mazda, the Subway Surfers, the Insomniacs, and others) covering songs spanning the Fleshtones' career.
Pardon Us For Living, But The Graveyard's Full,, a feature documentary directed by Geoffray Barbier based on Joe Bonomo's biography Sweat: The Story of The Fleshtones, America's Garage Band, was released from Cold Cuts Productions in 2009.
In 2010, the Australian label Raven released a CD compilation of the Fleshtones' I.R.S. Records material entitled It's "Super-Rock" Time!: The IRS Years 1980-1985 and a Hexbreaker! / Speed Connection CD.

Members

Keith Streng — guitar & vocals (1976–present)
Peter Zaremba — lead vocals, harmonica & organ (1976–present)
Bill Milhizer — drums & vocals (1980–present)
Ken Fox — bass & vocals (1990–present)

Former members
Jan Marek Pakulski — bass, vocals (1976–79, 1979–86)
Lenny Calderon — drums, vocals (1976–79)
Danny Gilbert — guitar (1976)
Gordon Spaeth — sax, harmonica, organ, vocals (1978–88) (d. 2005)
Mitchell Ames — guitar (1979)
Walter Scezney — bass (1979)
Robert Burke Warren — bass, vocals (1986–88)

Session/Touring
Clem Burke – drums (1979)
Fred Smith — bass, vocals (1988–89)
Andy Shernoff — bass, vocals (1989–90)

Horn players
Brian Spaeth — sax (1978–81)
Gregory D Grinnell — trumpet (1986)
Ken Fradley — trumpet (1988)
Mark McGowan — trumpet (1988–90)
Steve Greenfield — sax (1988–92)
Joe Loposky — trumpet (1990–94)
Markus Arike — sax (1992–94)

Timeline

Discography

Albums
Roman Gods (1982) [LP/cassette (I.R.S.) 1982 + CD [limited] (Eur. I.R.S.) 1990]
Blast Off! [recorded in 1978] (1982)  (ROIR) cassette + CD (ROIR) 1990 + CD (ROIR/Fr. Danceteria) 1993 + CD (Red Star) 1997 + LP (Sp. Munster) 2001 + LP (Get Hip Records) 2002
Hexbreaker! (1983) [LP/cassette (I.R.S.)]
Speed Connection: Live In Paris 85 (1985) LP (Fr. I.R.S.)
Speed Connection II - The Final Chapter (Live In Paris 85) (1985) LP/cassette (I.R.S.) 1985 + download (I.R.S.) 2010
Fleshtones vs. Reality (1987)  [LP/cassette/CD (Emergo)]
Soul Madrid (1989) LP (Sp. )
Powerstance! (1991) [CD/LP/cassette (Aus. Trafalgar) 1991 + CD/LP/cassette (UK Big Beat ) 1991 + CD (Naked Language/Ichiban) 1992 + download (Ichiban) 2006]
Beautiful Light (1994) [(Naked Language/Ichiban also Forever Fleshtones - Gr. Hitch Hyke)]
Laboratory of Sound (1995) [CD (Ichiban International) 1995 + LP (Gr. Hitch Hyke) 1996 + download (Ichiban) 2006]
Hitsburg USA! (1996) [LP (Telstar Records) + CD (Sp. ) also Fleshtones Favorites CD (Flesh)]
More Than Skin Deep (1997) [CD (Ichiban International) 1997 + LP (Telstar) 1997 + CD/LP (Eur. Epitaph) 1999 + download (Ichiban) 2006]
Hitsburg Revisited (1999) [CD (Telstar) + CD/LP (Eur. Epitaph)]
Solid Gold Sound (2001) [CD/LP (Blood Red) + CD (Fr. Fantastika) + download (Blood Red) 2009]
Do You Swing? (2003) [CD/LP (YepRoc)]
Beachhead (2005) [CD/LP (YepRoc) 2005 + LP (It. Nicotine)]
Take A Good Look (2008) [CD/LP (YepRoc)]
Stocking Stuffer (2008) [CD/LP (YepRoc)]
Brooklyn Sound Solution with Lenny Kaye (2011) [CD/LP (YepRoc)]
Wheel Of Talent (2014) [CD/LP (YepRoc)]
The Band Drinks For Free (2016) [CD/LP (YepRoc)]
Live at Yep Roc 15: The Fleshtones (2020) [digital (YepRoc)]
Face Of The Screaming Werewolf (2020) [CD/LP (YepRoc)]

Singles
American Beat b/w Critical List (1979) - 7" (Red Star)
The Girl from Baltimore b/w Feel the Heat (1980) - 7" (I.R.S.)
The World Has Changed b/w All Around the World (1981) - 7" (I.R.S.) 
Roman Gods [Dance Remix] b/w Ride Your Pony + Chinese Kitchen (1982) - 12" (I.R.S.)
Shadow-Line b/w All Around the World (1982) -  7" (I.R.S.)
American Beat '84 b/w Hall of Fame (1984) - 7" (I.R.S.) 
Armed and Dangerous b/w Let It Rip + Electric Mouse (1991) - 7" (UK Big Beat) 
Beautiful Light ["Big Mix"] + Treat Me Like a Man + Mushroom Cloud (1994) - CD (Naked Language) 
Take a Walk with The Fleshtones b/w One of Us (1994) - 7" (Naked Language) 
Gentleman's Twist b/w Red Sunset + Gentleman's Twist (featuring Alan Vega) (1998) - 7" (Eur. Epitaph) 
Jetset Fleshtones b/w Les Temps Dira (2007) - 7" (YepRoc) 
Bite of My Soul b/w Remember The Ramones (2011) - 7" (YepRoc) 
I Can't Hide b/w B-Side (2011) - 7" (YepRoc) 
For a Smile (featuring Mary Huff) b/w Everywhere Is Nowhere (featuring Mary Huff) (2013) - 7" (YepRoc) 
Available b/w Let's Live (2013) 7" - (YepRoc)
Gotta Get Away b/w 2000 Light Years from Home (Los Straitjackets) (2015) - 7" (Norton)
I Surrender! b/w Dominique Laboubee (2015) - 7" (YepRoc)
The End of My Neighborhood b/w Cardboard Casanova (2016) - 7" (YepRoc)
The Band Drinks for Free b/w Love My Lover (2016) - 7" (YepRoc)
Ama Como Un Hombre b/w Ama Mas (2016) - 7" (YepRoc)
Layin' Pipe b/w Lady Nightshade (2019) - 7" (YepRoc)
Lost on Xandu b/w ‘Lost on Xandu (Version) with Lenny Kaye (2019) - 7" (YepRoc)
Santa Claus Conquers the Martians (Milton DeLugg & The Little Eskimos) b/w Hooray for Santa Claus (2020) - 7" (Modern Harmonic)
Mi Engañaste Bien b/w Decimos Yeah! (2021) - 7" (YepRoc)

EPs
Up-Front (I.R.S.) 1980
American Beat ‘84 (Fr. I.R.S.) 1984
Los Fleshtones: Quatro x Quatro (Yep Roc) 2012

Compilations
The Fleshtones: Living Legends Series CD (I.R.S.) 1989
Angry Years 1984–1986 CD (Sp. Imposible) 1994 + CD (Amsterdamned) 1997
It's "Super-Rock" Time!: The IRS Years 1980–85 CD (Aus. Raven) 2010
Hexbreaker! / Speed Connection CD (Aus. Raven) 2010
Roman Gods / Up-Front / Speed Connection II CD (Aus. Raven) 2011
Budget Buster: Just the Hits! CD/LP (YepRoc) 2017

Compilation appearances
Marty Thau Presents 2 X 5 (Red Star Records) 1980 + 2005
 Start Swimming (Stiff Records) 1981
Bachelor Party (OST I.R.S.) 1984 + (Superfecta Records) 2003
688 Presents (688 Records) 1986I Was a Teenage Zombie (OST Columbia Records) 1987Time Bomb: Fleshtones Present the Big Bang Theory (Skyclad Records) 1988New York Rockers: Manhattan’s Original Rock Underground (ROIR) 1989Shangri-La: A Tribute to The Kinks (Imaginary Records) 1989Turban Renewal: A Tribute to Sam the Sham & The Pharaohs (Norton Records) 1994Dictators Forever Forever Dictators: A Tribute to The Dictators, Vol. 1 (Roto Records) 1996Super Bad @ 65: A Tribute to James Brown (Zero Hour) 1998Guitar Ace: Tribute to Link Wray (Musick Recordings) 2003Children of Nuggets: Original Artyfacts from the Second Psychedelic Era, 1976-1995 (Rhino) 2005Little Steven's Underground Garage Presents: The Coolest Songs In The World Vol. 3 (Wicked Cool Records) 2007So Indie It Hurts: Roir Rocks Volume Two (ROIR) 2010Mondo Zombie Boogaloo (YepRoc) 2013

Videos / DVDs
"Right Side of a Good Thing," The Beast of I.R.S. Video Vol. 1 VHS (I.R.S. Home Video) 1984
"F-f-fascination," Back in the Day: Live at Hurrah's New York City DVD (WEA) 2006The Fleshtones: Brooklyn à Paris! Live at La Maroquinerie DVD (Big Enough) 2006The Fleshtones—Live at the Hurrah Club DVD (Cherry Red) 2008
 Pardon Us for Living, but The Graveyard Is Full (Cold Cut Productions) 2009

Side projects
 Peter Zaremba's Love Delegation
 Full Time Men (Streng's side band which featured Peter Buck)
 The Tall Lonesome Pines (Pakulski's side band with George Gilmore)
 The Master Plan (Streng's side band with Milhizer, Paul Johnson, and Andy Shernoff)
 The Split Squad (Streng's side band with Clem Burke, Eddie Munoz, Michael Giblin, and Josh Kantor).
 Strengsbrew (Streng's Sweden-based side band with Robert Erikson of The Hellacopters, Jim Heneghan of The Solution, and Måns P. Månsson of The Maggots)

References

Further readingSweat: The Story of The Fleshtones, America's Garage Band'', Continuum, 2007, by Joe Bonomo
The Fleshtones Archive (articles, reviews, interviews, and commentary from 1977 to 2005)

External links
"Marty Thau Presents: The Fleshtones" from Rocker Magazine - Essay about discovering the band and their lasting impact by the man who put out their first single and album in the late 70's
Trailer for Pardon Us For Living But The Graveyard Is Full, feature documentary
Yep Roc Records (The Fleshtones' label)
Nicotine Records
Audio interview with Peter Zaremba of The Fleshtones on the release of 2008's Take a Good Look! on Well-Rounded Radio
Richard Mazda site
Interview in spanish magazine Efe Eme by Eduardo Tébar
[ The Fleshtones] at AllMusic
The Fleshtones at Trouser Press
The Fleshtones at Discogs

Garage punk groups
Garage rock groups from New York (state)
Ichiban Records artists
I.R.S. Records artists
ROIR artists
Musical groups established in 1976
Musical groups from Queens, New York
Musical quartets
1976 establishments in New York City
Telstar Records (U.S. label) artists
Yep Roc Records artists